ContainerArt was an itinerant public art event. The event used shipping containers to display works of contemporary art. Events have taken place in Italy and in some cities elsewhere. In Italy events have been held in Bergamo (2005) with 21 containers, Varese (2005) with 21 containers, Genoa (2007) with 24 containers, Rome (2007) with 14 containers, Milan (2008) with six containers, Turin (2008) with two containers, Casale Monferrato (2008) with four containers, and Genova (2008) in co-production with the Kaohsiung Museum of Fine Arts. The last named event, named "Ecosystems" included 26 containers spread around the port city, 14 of which formed part of the Kaohsiung Container Arts biennale and were shipped to Genoa directly from Kaohsiung, Taiwan. In the autumn of 2008 a simultaneous ContainerArt event in 4 cities was held under the name: "Beauty Inside Will Save the World" with four containers in Milan, four in Turin, four in Venice (Mestre) and one container in Tirana in Albania.

Internationally, ContainerArt also held events in New York City (2006) with eight containers in co-production with the DIVA fair, in Jerusalem (2007) with three containers and in São Paulo, under the leadership of Daniel Roesler and the curatorship of Lucas Bambozzi and Cao Guimares. The São Paulo event consisted of a temporary container museum structure assembled by the architectural firm of Bernardes & Jacobson and open to the public in Parque Villa Lobos between Nov 18 and 28, 2008. The temporary museum hosted exclusively contemporary video-art. In 2009, 2010, 2011 the event was also featured at the Pacific National Exhibit through a temporary container museum structure designed and managed by Peter Male. 

A ContainerArt event was held in Edmonton, Canada in 2011: a temporary museum structure positioned at the Capital Ex fair in Northlands from July 21 to July 31. The artists involved were the Nina Haggerty Centre for the Arts, Patti Matty, Jennifer Rae Forsyth, Monika Blichar, Colin Vince, Tyler Sherard, and Michael Coolidge

Event experience

ContainerArt events usually lasted for 10 days during which the container was open to the public. Containers were placed in the streets, and in public parks. Maps were distributed so that visitors could explore unusual neighbourhoods and places through art. ContainerArt also placed "bStrogs" or street blogs outside the open containers. Computers connected to the internet were sometimes used to comment upon the work. ContainerArt also made use of Bluetooth technologies to communicate information on the works and events to the phones of passers-by.

Organization and curator

The event was produced by the Associazione Cuturale ContainerArt, an Italian non-profit association headed by Ronald Lewis Facchinetti. Facchinetti's curatorial philosophy was described in his book "Beauty Inside", and was primarily concerned with helping the viewer achieve the "aesthetic experience" while isolated inside a container and in front of the work of art. ContainerArt also operated as an international franchise with partners in various countries, including Brazil, China, Canada and Israel.

Partners

ContainerArt had a content partner philosophy by which some containers are curated by institutions, museums or associations. Content partners included Gamec, Festival Internazionale di PoesiaZoneattive, Premio Celeste and Oyoyoy! Festival.

Selection process

ContainerArt projects not curated by content partners were directly chosen by Ronald Lewis Facchinetti in association with local co-curators or franchisees. Any artist could apply by sending a project and filling out an application available on the ContainerArt website.

Artists could exhibit free of charge. Artists whose project was approved were assigned a container in which to exhibit their work.
The event allowed them to display their project in an unusual context with wide access to the general population of a city.

External links
https://web.archive.org/web/20090126233805/http://www.containerart.com.br/
http://www2.canada.com/vancouvercourier/news/story.html?id=a3835bd2-456c-4b7c-bf5f-d4003f1345c1
https://web.archive.org/web/20110706212442/http://wallfarmers.ca/?section=39&id=151
http://tvuol.uol.com.br/#view/id=metropolis--container-art-04023272C8A93326/user=1xu2xa5tnz3h/date=2008-11-20
http://www.mentelocale.it/arte/contenuti/index_html/id_contenuti_varint_20933
http://www.genovapress.com/index.php/content/view/23220/46/
https://web.archive.org/web/20160304061755/http://www.dexigner.com/news/5608
http://www.alphabetcity.it/index.php?com=articolo&id=1251
http://www.luxury24.ilsole24ore.com/ArteCreativita/2007/11/container-art%20_1.php
http://www.ilgiornale.it/a.pic1?ID=224520&PRINT=S
http://www.dazebao.org/index.php?option=com_content&task=view&id=1321&Itemid=70
http://www.mentelocale.it/contenuti/index_html/id_contenuti_varint_17467
https://archive.today/20110722035618/http://notizie.interfree.it/cgi-bin/desc.cgi?id=134479
http://www.exibart.com/profilo/eventiV2.asp/idelemento/47954
http://www.undo.net/cgi-bin/undo/pressrelease/pressrelease.pl?id=1174233584
https://archive.today/20070702191738/http://www.amicidisraele.org/news.php?extend.238

Further reading
Facchinetti, Ronald Lewis: "Beauty Inside". DPS editore, Collezione Rabano, 2007

Art exhibitions in Italy